This list is for fictional artificial intelligences.

Static robots, androids, cyborgs and computers depicted in fiction are discussed in the separate list of fictional robots and androids, list of fictional cyborgs and list of fictional computers.

Comics

1950s
 Cerebex (1953)
 Brainiac from the Superman comics (1958)

1960s
 Ultron from the  Avengers (1968)

1990s
 LYLA, short for LYrate Lifeform Approximation from the Spider-Man 2099 comics (1992)
 Mr. Smartie, a teacher for Astra Furst (1995)

2000s
 Terror 2000 on Terra Obscura (2001)
 Multiple from the Schlock Mercenary webcomic (2000-2020), with Ennesby and Post-Dated Check Loan ("Petey") being some of the most prominent ones.

2010s
 Multiple from The True Lives of the Fabulous Killjoys comic series (2013-2014) by Gerard Way and Shaun Simon, including the android prostitutes Blue and Red, as well as the robot messiah DESTROYA.

Novels

1960s
 AM, from the short story I Have No Mouth, and I Must Scream by Harlan Ellison (1967)

1970s
 Proteus IV from Demon Seed by Dean Koontz (1973)
 Deep Thought, Marvin the Paranoid Android from The Hitchhiker's Guide to the Galaxy (1979)

1980s
 Wintermute and Neuromancer from Neuromancer by William Gibson
 Continuity, from Mona Lisa Overdrive by William Gibson

1990s
 The Librarian from the novel Snow Crash by Neal Stephenson
 Rei Toei from Idoru and All Tomorrow's Parties by William Gibson

2010s
 The Thunderhead, from the Arc of a Scythe series by Neal Shusterman, a post-singularity AI tasked with running the planet. It is a secondary character in the first novel and becomes a central character in the later novels.

Film

1960s
 HAL 9000 from 2001: A Space Odyssey (1968)

1970s
 The Tabernacle from Zardoz (1974)

1980s
 Master Control Program, Sark and Tron from Tron (1982)
 Skynet from the Terminator series

1990s
 Agents Brown, Jones, and Smith from The Matrix. Other programs includes The Oracle (1999)
 S.E.T.H. (self evolving thought helix) from Universal Soldier: The Return (1999)

2000s
 The Oracle, Seraph, Merovingian, Persephone, and the Architect from The Matrix Reloaded. The Agent programs are upgraded. The new Agents included Jackson, Johnson, and Thompson. Agent Smith is now a computer virus with the ability to copy himself using humans and programs. (2003)
 The Oracle, Seraph, Sati, Rama Kandra, Kamala, Merovigian, Persephone, Architect, and Smith from The Matrix Revolutions. (2003)

2010s
 J.A.R.V.I.S. from the Iron Man, Iron Man 2, The Avengers, Iron Man 3, and Avengers: Age of Ultron.
 F.R.I.D.A.Y., replacement A.I. for Tony Stark / Iron Man, after J.A.R.V.I.S. is destroyed by Ultron, from the Avengers: Age of Ultron, Captain America: Civil War,, Spider-Man: Homecoming,  Avengers: Infinity War and Avengers: Endgame.
 Samantha from her (2013)
 STEM from Upgrade (2018)

Television series

1980s
 Automan and Cursor from Automan (1983)
 Max Headroom, a TV host personality who appeared in various TV shows
 Data from Star Trek: The Next Generation (1987)
 Holly from the TV Sitcom Red Dwarf (1988)
 Ziggy from the sci-fi series Quantum Leap (1989)

1990s
 MAL from Captain Planet and the Planeteers (1990)
 The Doctor hologram from Star Trek: Voyager (1995)

2000s
 The Andromeda Ascendant's avatars, including the android "Rommie", from Gene Roddenberry's Andromeda (2000)]
 D.A.V.E. (Digital Advanced Villain Emulator) from The Batman (2004)
 Sigmund from Fanboy & Chum Chum (2009)

2010s
 The Machine from Person of Interest 2011-2016

Video games

1990s
 LINC and "Joey" from Beneath A Steel Sky
 SHODAN from the System Shock game series
 Deus from Xenogears

2000s
 Cortana from the Halo game series (also the inspiration for the name of Microsoft's real-world personal assistant in Windows 10)
 EDI from the Mass Effect game series
 GLaDOS from the Portal game series

 Daedelus, Icarus, Helios and other minor AI in Deus Ex.

2010s
 Commander Tartar from Splatoon 2: Octo Expansion
 Sage from Starlink: Battle for Atlas
 Turing, Baby Blue and Big Blue from 2064: Read Only Memories
 B.A.C.S. and J.A.C.S. from Void Bastards
 A.R.I.D from The Fall

See also 

 Artificial intelligence in fiction
 List of fictional robots and androids
 List of fictional cyborgs
 List of fictional computers
 List of fictional gynoids
 List of fictional cyborgs

References

Science fiction themes